Monrad may refer to:

Cally Monrad (1879–1950), Norwegian singer, actress and poet
David Monrad Johansen (1888–1974), Norwegian composer
Ditlev Gothard Monrad (1811–1887), Danish politician and bishop of Lolland-Falster
I. H. Monrad Aas (born 1948), Norwegian researcher
Jens Zetlitz Monrad Kielland (1866–1926), Norwegian architect
Jesper Monrad (born 1976), Danish handballer
Lars Monrad-Krohn (born 1933), Norwegian engineer and entrepreneur
Martin Monrad (born 1977), male table tennis player from Denmark
Monrad Metzgen (1894–1956), well known national hero of Belize having been a leading citizen in the Colony of British Honduras
Monrad Norderval (1902–1976), Norwegian bishop
Monrad Wallgren (1891–1961), American politician, served as the 13th Governor of Washington from 1945 to 1949

See also
92297 Monrad (provisional designation: 2000 EL156), a main-belt minor planet